Caladenia × triangularis, commonly known as the shy spider orchid, is a plant in the orchid family Orchidaceae and is endemic to the south-west of Western Australia. It has a single hairy leaf and up to three pale yellow flowers. A natural hybrid between flava and C. longicauda, it is a rare species found between Perth and Esperance.

Description
The petals and lateral sepals spread widely apart and the labellum is relatively small with a short fringe and four or more rows of calli along its mid-line. Flowering occurs from August to October.

Taxonomy and naming
Caladeni × triangularis was first formally described 1827 by Richard Sanders Rogers from a specimen collected between Wagin and Narrogin. The description was published in Transactions and Proceedings of the Royal Society of South Australia.  The epithet (triangularis) refers to the shape of the labellum of this orchid.

Distribution and habitat
The shy spider orchid grows in woodland and shrubland between Perth and Esperance in the Avon Wheatbelt and Jarrah Forest biogeographic regions.

Conservation
Caladenia × triangularis  is classified as "Priority Four" by the Government of Western Australia Department of Parks and Wildlife, meaning that is rare or near threatened.

References

triangularis
Endemic orchids of Australia
Orchids of Western Australia
Plants described in 1927
Orchid hybrids